Late Last Night is a 1999 television film directed and written by Steven Brill. The film stars Emilio Estevez and Steven Weber and also features cameo appearances by Allen Covert and Kelly Monaco.

Plot
It's Christmas and Dan (Estevez) is an entertainment lawyer whose wife (Kelly Rowan) has recently left him. Dan decides to re-examine his life and find himself. Dan gets together with a mysterious friend named Jeff (Weber), who will do anything for Dan to have a good time.

Dan has an eventful night spent in bars, clubs, and parties with high maintenance call girls and others in this unforgettable night. But Dan mixes fantasy, reality and everything in between. By the end of the night, it's possible that Dan might find what's missing in his life.

Cast
Emilio Estevez as Dan
Bobby Edner as The Stranger Danger Kid
Steven Weber as Jeff
Kelly Rowan as Jill
Leah Lail as Angel
Lisa Robin Kelly as Tristan
Marshall Bell as Bartender
Reni Santoni as Drunk
John Carroll Lynch as Sgt. Van Wyck
Catherine O'Hara as Shrink
Katie Wright as Mia

External links

1999 films
American Christmas films
American screwball comedy films
American comedy television films
Films directed by Steven Brill
1990s screwball comedy films
Films with screenplays by Steven Brill
1999 comedy films
1990s English-language films
1990s American films